Alegría is a municipality in the Usulután department of El Salvador.

Overview
Located at approximately 1,200 meters above sea level, the municipality's cool climate lends itself to many thriving local plant nurseries, some of which specialize in tropical flowers such as birds of paradise, anthuriums, orchids, and varieties of bromelias. The town is famous for its volcanic lake, the Alegría Laguna, which is a national protected area managed by the NGO ADESCAM. There is a local myth that a siren or mermaid lives in the lake, and that she will lure men who swim there to their deaths. Rural villages belonging to the municipality include El Zapotillo.

Laguna Alegría

In the Sierra of Chinameca, one of the most important volcanoes is Tecapa, located at 26 kilometers away from Usulután, and 2 kilometers to the south of Alegria. Its peak, in the famous plain of Quemela, at 1,603 meters above sea level exhibits a big rocky crater, oval and guided from east to west in whose bottom, in eccentric position to the southeast and at 1,250 meters high, a small crater form lake of yellow-greenish waters exists, resting on mantels of sulfur. The highest part of the crater circumvallation to the northeast is the culminating point of the volcanic cone and the lowest is to the east and at 1,275 meters high. In that area a current of lava was spilled in prehistoric time.
 
The little lagoon is one of the most beautiful places of the country. It was called formerly Tecapa, the same as the volcano, but from recent times it is also denominated "Laguna de Alegria", because it is next to the city of the same name. It has thermal sources and fumaroles, mainly in the northwest direction and a circumvallation highway for driven vehicles. In nahuat language the name of Tecapa means "Lagoon of stones."
In the skirts of the volcano Tecapa, to the north, are the thermal sources or fumaroles of Bufadero, Tronador, Tronadorcito, Loma China, and El Pinar.

Laguna de Alegria is also known as "America's Emerald" thanks to Gabriela Mistral nobel prize in literature winner in 1945.

In the park of the city of Alegria, the bust in memory of educator Presbytery José Miguel Alegria is erected. He was a remarkable professor of Latin who founded in the town of Tecapa around 1838, a philosophy school. Because of the Law of February 17 of 1891, the city of Tecapa was denominated city of Alegria. This famous professor's body remains in the crypt of this population's parochial church.

The current temple of Alegria began being built on August 26, 1870. Alegria is the cradle of the illustrious Salvadoran teacher and thinker don Alberto Masferrer.

References

Municipalities of the Usulután Department